The Democratic Republic of the Congo competed at the 2012 Summer Olympics in London, United Kingdom from 27 July to 12 August 2012. This was the nation's ninth appearance at the Olympics since its debut in 1968, although four of its appearances were under the name "Zaire", and the first appearance was under the name "Congo Kinshasa".

Four athletes from the Democratic Republic of the Congo were selected to the team, 3 men and 1 woman, to compete only in athletics, boxing, and judo. Marathon runner Ilunga Mande Zatara was the nation's flag bearer at the opening ceremony. Democratic Republic of Congo, however, has yet to win its first Olympic medal.

On the day after the closing ceremonies, four members from the national delegation were reported missing in London: judoka Cédric Mandembo and his coach Ibula Masengo, boxing coach Blaise Bekwa, and athletics coach Guy Nkita.

Athletics

Men

Women

Boxing

DR Congo qualified one boxer for the Games; Meji Mwamba competed in the men's super heavyweight division.

Judo

DR Congo qualified a single judoka.

See also
 DR Congo at the 2012 Summer Paralympics

References

External links
 
 

Nations at the 2012 Summer Olympics
2012
Oly